The Fuller-Eliott-Drake Baronetcy, of Nutwell Court, Buckland Abbey, or Monachorum, Sherford, and Yarcombe in the County of Devon, was a title in the Baronetage of the United Kingdom. It was created on 22 August 1821 for the soldier Thomas Fuller-Eliott-Drake, with remainder in default of male issue of his own to his next two younger brothers, William Stephen Fuller and Rose Henry Fuller, and their male issue. Born Thomas Fuller, he was a grandson of George Augustus Eliott, 1st Baron Heathfield, and grand-nephew of the last Drake Baronet of Buckland, and adopted the additional surnames of Eliott and Drake upon his inheritance of Buckland Abbey and Nutwell Court from the second Lord Heathfield in 1813. He was succeeded according to the special remainder by his nephew, the second Baronet, a son of the younger of his two brothers, who had also adopted the additional surnames. The title  became extinct upon his death without a male heir in 1916. The second Baronet's only child married the third Baron Seaton, who also adopted the Eliott and Drake surnames.

Fuller-Eliott-Drake baronets, of Nutwell Court and Yarcombe (1821)
Sir Thomas Trayton Fuller-Eliott-Drake, 1st Baronet (1785–1870)
Sir Francis George Augustus Fuller-Eliott-Drake, 2nd Baronet (1837–1916)

See also
Baron Heathfield
Drake baronets
Baron Seaton
Fuller baronets

References

Extinct baronetcies in the Baronetage of the United Kingdom
Baronetcies created with special remainders